Petrony Santiago de Barros (born February 18, 1980, in Salinas, Minas Gerais), or simply Santiago, is a Brazilian footballer who plays as a central defender for Boavista Sport Club. His previous clubs include Portuguesa (SP), América (RJ), Daegu FC in South Korea, Vasco da Gama, Olaria, Atlético Mineiro, Fortaleza, Brasiliense and Duque de Caxias.

References

External links
 

1980 births
Brazilian footballers
Association football defenders
Living people
Clube Atlético Mineiro players
CR Vasco da Gama players
Daegu FC players
America Football Club (RJ) players
Brasiliense Futebol Clube players
Fortaleza Esporte Clube players
Duque de Caxias Futebol Clube players
Olaria Atlético Clube players
K League 1 players
Associação Portuguesa de Desportos players
Expatriate footballers in South Korea
Brazilian expatriate sportspeople in South Korea